Robert James Thomas Digby-Jones (27 September 1876 – 6 January 1900) was a Scottish recipient of the Victoria Cross, the highest and most prestigious award for gallantry in the face of the enemy that can be awarded to British and Commonwealth forces.

Details

He was born at Chester Street in Edinburgh the son of Charles Digby Jones (1826–1911) and his wife, Aimee Susanna Christie. He was educated at Alnmouth and then Sedbergh School. In 1894 he was sent to the Royal Military Academy, Woolwich and trained as an officer in the Royal Engineers. He is recorded as a keen and popular sportsman, both in golf and rugby.

When he was 23 years old, and a lieutenant in the Corps of Royal Engineers, British Army during the Boer War when the following deed took place for which he was awarded the VC.

On 6 January 1900 during the attack on Wagon Hill (Ladysmith), South Africa, Lieutenant Digby-Jones and a trooper (Herman Albrecht) of the Imperial Light Horse led the force which re-occupied the top of the hill at a critical moment, but both were killed in the ensuing mêlée. For their actions they cited jointly:

Digby-Jones is buried in Ladysmith Cemetery.

He is also memorialised on his parents grave in Dean Cemetery in Edinburgh.

Memorials and the medal
Digby-Jones's Victoria Cross is displayed at the Royal Engineers Museum (Chatham, England).
A memorial to Digby-Jones stands in his old school, Sedbergh, commemorating his brave deeds.
A brass plaque to Digby-Jones lies on the south aisle of St Mary's Episcopal Cathedral in Edinburgh. The plaque states that it was erected by his parents and brothers.
A cairn was erected at Waggon Hill at the spot where he died
A memorial plaque to his memory also stands in Alnmouth Parish Church

Family

He came from a long line of military personnel and another cousin, Robert Hope Moncrieff Aitken had already won a Victoria Cross.

References
Monuments to Courage (David Harvey, 1999)
The Register of the Victoria Cross (This England, 1997)
The Sapper VCs (Gerald Napier, 1998)
Scotland's Forgotten Valour (Graham Ross, 1995)
Victoria Crosses of the Anglo-Boer War (Ian Uys, 2000)

Notes

External links
 Photo of memorial in Ladysmith cemetery listing Robert James Thomas Digby-Jones, from Genealogical Society of South Africa online library.

1876 births
1900 deaths
British military personnel killed in the Second Boer War
Second Boer War recipients of the Victoria Cross
British recipients of the Victoria Cross
Royal Engineers officers
British Army personnel of the Second Boer War
People educated at Sedbergh School
Graduates of the Royal Military Academy, Woolwich
Royal Engineers A.F.C. players
Military personnel from Edinburgh
British Army recipients of the Victoria Cross
Scottish footballers
Association footballers not categorized by position